Tianming is a town in Chenggu County, Hanzhong, Shaanxi province, China. , it had one residential community and 22 villages under its administration.

See also 
 List of township-level divisions of Shaanxi

References 

Township-level divisions of Shaanxi
Chenggu County